John Rigmayden  (1515/16–1557), of Wedacre in Garstang, Lancashire, was an English politician.

He was a Member (MP) of the Parliament of England for Lancashire in October 1553.

References

1510s births
1557 deaths
English MPs 1553 (Mary I)
Members of the Parliament of England (pre-1707) for Lancashire